Six60 is the self-titled debut studio album by New Zealand rock band Six60. Released on 10 October 2011, it debuted at No. 1 on the New Zealand albums chart and was certified Gold in its first week. The album includes the songs "Rise Up 2.0" and "Don't Forget Your Roots".

Singles
 "Rise Up 2.0" was released as the album's lead single on 30 August 2010. It peaked at number 1 on the New Zealand singles chart.
 "Don't Forget Your Roots" is the second single from the album. It was released on 18 July 2011. It peaked at number 2 on the New Zealand singles chart.
 "Only to Be" is the third single from the album. It peaked at number 5 on the New Zealand singles chart.
 "Forever" is the fourth single from the album. It peaked at number 13 on the New Zealand singles chart (as of 27 March 2012).
 "In the Clear" was released as the fifth single, remixed by dance producer Paul Mac for its single release. It peaked at number 12 on the New Zealand singles chart.
 "Finest Wine" was released as the album's sixth single early in 2013. It failed to reach the New Zealand singles chart, but enjoyed success on the local chart.

Track listing

Charts

Weekly charts

Year-end charts

Certifications and sales

Release history

References

2011 debut albums
Six60 albums